The name Aletta has been used for nine tropical cyclones in the Eastern Pacific Ocean.

Tropical Storm Aletta (1974), made landfall in southwest Mexico.
Hurricane Aletta (1978), a Category 1 hurricane that made landfall near Zihuatanejo, Guerrero.
Tropical Storm Aletta (1982), moved erratically off the coast of southern Mexican and contributed to severe flooding in central America.
Tropical Storm Aletta (1988), approached the Acapulco area of the Mexican coast, it did not make landfall.
Tropical Storm Aletta (1994), formed well away from land.
Hurricane Aletta (2000), a Category 2 hurricane that stayed to the south of Mexico.
Tropical Storm Aletta (2006), brushed southwestern Mexico.
Tropical Storm Aletta (2012), remained far out to sea.

Pacific hurricane set index articles